Xibër is a former municipality in the Dibër County, northern Albania. At the 2015 local government reform it became a subdivision of the municipality Klos. The population at the 2011 census was 2,660.

Demographic history
Xibër (Çipur) is recorded in the Ottoman defter of 1467 as village in the timar of Ballaban in the vilayet of Mati. The settlement had a total of six households represented by the following household heads: Todor Bogdani, Shurb Bardi, Benk Kirakesi, Gjergj Palazi, Dom Progoni, and Shirgj Bardi.

References

Former municipalities in Dibër County
Administrative units of Klos (municipality)
Villages in Dibër County